Kant is a small lunar impact crater that is located to the northwest of the prominent crater Cyrillus and the comparably sized Ibn Rushd. To the northwest is Zöllner, and to the east is Mons Penck. This last feature forms a mountainous promontory reaching a height of about 4 km. The crater is named after the German philosopher Immanuel Kant.

This crater has a well-defined and somewhat uneven rim that is roughly circular in shape. The inner walls have a higher albedo than the surrounding surface, giving them a lighter appearance. Parts of the inner wall have slumped across the inner floor, producing an irregular surface. At the midpoint of the interior is a low central rise, with a craterlet at the summit, giving the appearance of terrestrial volcano, although the peak is probably not volcanic.

Satellite craters
By convention these features are identified on lunar maps by placing the letter on the side of the crater midpoint that is closest to Kant.

References

External links

 LTO-78C1 Kant — L&PI topographic orthophoto map.

Impact craters on the Moon